Diatraea busckella is a moth in the family Crambidae. It was described by Harrison Gray Dyar Jr. and Carl Heinrich in 1927. It is found in Panama, Ecuador, Colombia and Venezuela.

References

Chiloini
Moths described in 1927